Valmiki Nagar may refer to 
in Bihar
 Valmiki National Park
 Valmiki Nagar Assembly constituency
 Valmiki Nagar Lok Sabha constituency
 Valmikinagar Road railway station
in Maharashtra
 Valmiki Nagar village